L'Androuno is one of the world's narrowest streets found in the city of Gassin, France. 

It measures 29 centimeters (11.41 inches) at its narrowest point.

The name derives from a Greek term for a passage between two houses, with a subtext for a place for men only, such as a hiding place or a latrine. The Provencal term is defined as an "alley", a "cul-de-sac", or a "void that separates two houses", with the same subtext.

See also 
 Spreuerhofstraße: A narrow street in Germany
 Fan Tan Alley: A narrow street in Canada
 Mårten Trotzigs Gränd: A narrow street in Sweden
 Parliament Street, Exeter: A narrow street in the United Kingdom
 Strada sforii: A narrow street in Romania
 9 de Julio Avenue: The widest street in the world in Buenos Aires

References

Var (department)
Pedestrian streets in France